A beitass, or a stretching pole, is a wooden spar used on Viking ships that was fitted into a pocket at the lower corner of the sail. This innovation was used to stiffen and hold the edge of the sail when sailing close to the wind.

References

Sailboat components
Sailing ship components